Djanogly may refer to:

 Jonathan Djanogly (born 1965), British Conservative politician
 Djanogly City Academy, school in Nottingham, England
 Harry Djanogly (born 1938), British textile manufacturer, father of Jonathan
 Sir Harry and Lady Djanogly Learning Resource Centre at the University of Nottingham